The Roman Catholic Church in Gabon is composed of one ecclesiastical province with 4 suffragan dioceses.

List of dioceses

Episcopal Conference of Gabon

Ecclesiastical Province of Libreville 
Archdiocese of Libreville (1842; diocese 1955; archdiocese 1958)
Diocese of Franceville (1974)
Diocese of Mouila (1958)
Diocese of Oyem (1969)
Diocese of Port-Gentil (2003)

Immediately subject to the Holy See 
Apostolic Vicariate of Makokou

External links 
Catholic-Hierarchy entry.
GCatholic.org.

Gabon
Catholic dioceses